There are at least 15 named lakes and reservoirs in Howard County, Arkansas.

Lakes
	Wilson Pond, el.

Reservoirs
	Barnes Lake, el.  
	Briar Plant Lake One, el.  
	Briar Plant Lake Three, el.  
	Briar Plant Lake Two, el.  
	Davis Lake, el.  
	Dierks Lake, el.  
	Gillham Lake, el.  
	Kever Lake, el.  
	Lake Nickels, el.  
	McAdams Lake, el.  
	McClure Lake, el.  
	Millwood Lake, el.  
	North Fork Ozan Creek Site Four Reservoir, el.  
	Scotty Lake, el.

See also

 List of lakes in Arkansas

Notes

Bodies of water of Howard County, Arkansas
Howard